William 'Bill' Jackson Clothier (September 27, 1881 – September 4, 1962) was an American tennis player.

Biography
William J. Clothier was a top American tennis player in the early 1900s and reached the singles final of the United States Championships three times. In his first final appearance in 1904 he lost in three straight sets to compatriot Holcombe Ward. Two years later, in 1906, Clothier achieved his greatest success by emphatically beating Beals Wright in the final in three straight sets at the Newport Casino. This despite breaking his pelvic bone in a riding accident earlier that year. His last appearance in the final came in 1909 when he lost in five sets to William Larned who claimed his fifth singles title.

Clothier won the intercollegiate tennis singles and doubles championship in 1902 playing for Harvard, where he was a three sport athlete and also played hockey and football.

He was a member of the winning USA Davis Cup Team in 1905 and 1909 and won both his singles matches in the 1909 final against the British Isles.

Together with his son, William J. Clothier II, they two won the national father-son title held at Longwood Cricket Club twice in 1935 and 1936.

Clothier was inducted into the International Tennis Hall of Fame in 1956 and was elected its first President in 1954, a position he held until 1957.

Clothier also played amateur ice hockey from 1900 to 1904 with the Quaker City Hockey Club in Philadelphia and the Harvard Crimson intercollegiate team in Cambridge, Massachusetts.

Clothier is interred in the family plot at West Laurel Hill Cemetery, Summit Section, in Bala Cynwyd, Pennsylvania.

Playing style
In their book R.F. and H.L. Doherty - On Lawn Tennis (1903) multiple Wimbledon champions Reginald and Lawrence Doherty described Clothier's playing style:

On Lawn Tennis - 1903

Grand Slam finals

Singles (1 title, 2 runners-up)

Mixed doubles: (1 runner-up)

References

External links 
 
 
 
 

1881 births
1962 deaths
People from Sharon Hill, Pennsylvania
American male tennis players
Burials at West Laurel Hill Cemetery
Tennis players from Philadelphia
International Tennis Hall of Fame inductees
United States National champions (tennis)
Grand Slam (tennis) champions in men's singles
Harvard Crimson men's tennis players
Harvard Crimson men's ice hockey